Neudrossenfeld is a municipality  in the district of Kulmbach in Bavaria in Germany.

Boroughs

Neudrossenfeld is composed of the following boroughs:

Sport
The towns association football club TSV Neudrossenfeld, formed in 1924, celebrated its greatest success in 2014 when it won promotion to the northern division of the Bayernliga for the first time.

References

Kulmbach (district)